Sam Wykes (born 25 April 1988) is a rugby union footballer. His regular playing position is lock. He made his debut during the 2008 Super 14 season against the Cheetahs in Bloemfontein.

Super Rugby statistics

External links 
Western Force profile
itsrugby.co.uk profile

1988 births
Australian rugby union players
Australian sportspeople of Tongan descent
Western Force players
Rugby union locks
Rugby union players from Sydney
Living people
Perth Spirit players
Coca-Cola Red Sparks players
Australian expatriate rugby union players
Australian expatriate sportspeople in Japan
Expatriate rugby union players in Japan
Sunwolves players
Saitama Wild Knights players
Shimizu Koto Blue Sharks players
New South Wales Waratahs players